Immanuel Episcopal Church is a historic Episcopal church at 416 Summit Street in Winona, Mississippi.

It was built in 1909 and added to the National Register of Historic Places in 2005.

References

Episcopal church buildings in Mississippi
Churches on the National Register of Historic Places in Mississippi
Gothic Revival church buildings in Mississippi
Churches completed in 1909
National Register of Historic Places in Montgomery County, Mississippi
Winona, Mississippi